The 2015 MBC Drama Awards, presented by Munhwa Broadcasting Corporation (MBC) took place on December 30, 2015. It was hosted by Shin Dong-yup and Lee Sung-kyung. Two new categories were awarded: "Top 10 Stars Award" and "Best Supporting Actor".

Winners and nominees

Winners denoted in bold
The Grand Prize (Daesang) has been determined through viewer's votes since 2014, and not by a professional set of judges.

References

External links
http://www.imbc.com/broad/tv/ent/event/2015mbc/

MBC Drama Awards
MBC Drama Awards
MBC Drama Awards